Giuliana "Shula" Gavilán  (born 7 March 1996) is an Argentine handball player for Liberbank Gijón and the Argentine national team.

She was selected to represent Argentina at the 2017 World Women's Handball Championship.

Individual awards and achievements
2017 Pan American Women's Club Handball Championship – Best pivot
2017 Pan American Women's Club Handball Championship – MVP

References

1996 births
Living people
Argentine female handball players
South American Games silver medalists for Argentina
South American Games medalists in handball
Expatriate handball players
Argentine expatriate sportspeople in Spain
Sportspeople from Córdoba Province, Argentina
Competitors at the 2018 South American Games
People from Villa María
21st-century Argentine women